The Marketing Group is a global marketing network. It was incorporated in May 2015 and listed on Nasdaq First North Stockholm on 8 June 2016. It is also cross-listed on the Frankfurt Stock Exchange. Adam Graham is the CEO and Don Elgie is the Chairman.

The Group's service offering includes social media, content creation, events, public relations, e-learning, app development, game development, lead generation, sponsorship, TV production, branding, digital marketing, web and e-commerce and many other services.

The company has locations in the United Kingdom, France, Germany, Singapore, the United States, Australia, and New Zealand.

The Marketing Group is based on a buy-and-build strategy aimed at creating a global full service marketing network. The strategy, a variation on the traditional mergers and acquisitions roll-up, leverages the concept of economies of agglomeration and economies of scale. Currently, The Marketing Group comprises 18 wholly owned subsidiary brands which each retain a large degree of operational independence, are profitable and in growth phase. It was the third largest acquirer in the marketing communications sector in 2016 with 16 deals, behind Dentsu Aegis Network and WPP plc.

The Marketing Group and agglomeration
The Marketing Group was founded on the concept of agglomeration. This term describes a model in which a number of private small and medium-sized enterprises from within the same industry come together under a single publicly listed holding company. Each subsidiary businesses of the listed holding company retains its own brand and operational independence, but benefits from the scale, access to talent, services and markets and operational synergies associated with being part of the larger company.

References

External links

Advertising agencies of Sweden
Swedish companies established in 2015
Marketing companies established in 2015